Mohammad Farhad (July 5, 1938 – October 9, 1987), popularly known as "Comrade Farhad", was a guerrilla force commander during the Bangladesh independence war, and the  President of Communist Party of Bangladesh and a member of Bangladesh Parliament.

Early life
Mohammad Farhad was born in Khetripara of Dinajpur district in present Bangladesh to. His father's name was Ahmed Sadakatul Bari and mother's was Tayabunnesa. He was an Urdu-speaking Bangladeshi. He finished his matriculation from Dinajpur Jila School in 1953 and received his master's degree in political science from Dhaka University in 1961.

Politics
Comrade Farhad played a  role during different movements in the Pakistan and Bangladesh, including the 1952 Bengali Language Movement, 1962 Education Movement, 1968–69 Pakistan Mass Upheaval, 1971 Bangladesh Liberation War and the post-71 Democracy movement.

During the 1971 war, he helped lead the guerrilla forces jointly formed by the Communist Party, NAP and Chhatra Union. A ‘Special Guerilla Force’ under the direct command of CPB-NAP-BSU fought against the Pakistani army. Moni Singh, the ex-President of CPB, was elected a member of the Advisory Council of the Provisional Government of Bangladesh.

He was imprisoned during the Pakistan period, as well as during  the Zia and Ershad period of Bangladesh politics. Mohammad Farhad was  elected as a member of Bangladesh Parliament in 1986 from his home district Panchagarh, which he held until his death.

Death
On October 8, 1987, while on an official visit to Moscow, Soviet Union, as a delegate from Bangladesh Parliament, Mohammad Farhad died of a sudden heart attack at the age of 49. He left behind his wife and two children. The Moni Singh-Farhad Memorial Trust was established, twinning his name with that of Communist Party founding member Comrade Moni Singh, now serves as a center for intellectuals in Bangladesh.

References

1938 births
1987 deaths
Communist Party of Bangladesh politicians
4th Jatiya Sangsad members
Bangladesh Krishak Sramik Awami League central committee members